Burg Seebenstein is a castle in Seebenstein, Lower Austria, Austria.

See also
List of castles in Austria

References

This article was initially translated from the German Wikipedia.

External links
 History and visiting information 

Castles in Lower Austria
Museums in Lower Austria
Historic house museums in Austria
Bucklige Welt